Anil Kumar Tyagi (born 2 April 1951) is former Vice Chancellor of Guru Gobind Singh Indraprastha University Delhi. Prior to this he was co-ordinator of UGC- SAP Programme and head of Department of Biochemistry at South Campus of Delhi University and was Vice President of the Society of Biological Chemists, India from the year 2004 to 2006.

Awards and distinctions 
 J.C. Bose Fellowship (2010).
 Vigyan Gaurav Samman Award from CST, UP Government. (2010).
 Vice President, Society of Biological Chemists (India) from 2004 to 2006.
 Ranbaxy Research Award, 1999.
 Dr. Nitya Anand Endowment Lecture Award of INSA, 1999.
 Shanti Swarup Bhatnagar Prize for Science and Technology in Medical Science, 1995.
 P.S. Sarma memorial award of the Society of Biological Chemists (India), 1993.
 Dr. Kona Sampath Kumar prize of the University of Delhi, 1983.
 Fellow of the National Academy of Sciences, Indian Academy of Science and Indian National Science Academy.
 C.R. Krishnamurthy Memorial Oration Award by CDRI, Lucknow (2007)
 Prof. S.H. Zaidi Oration Award by ITRC, Lucknow (2005)
 Dr. Kona Sampath Kumar prize by the University of Delhi (1983)
 Fellow of the Society for Immunology and Immunopath

Professional associations and societies 
 Member of Guha Research Conference
 Life Member of the Society of Biological Chemists
 Life Member of Indian Society of Cell Biology
 Life Member of Association of Microbiologists of India

Publications 
 Communalism and ramakatha in historical perspective
 Women Workers In Ancient India

References 

1951 births
Living people
Academic staff of Delhi University
Recipients of the Shanti Swarup Bhatnagar Award in Medical Science